Sidney Wright Benton (August 4, 1894 – March 8, 1977) was a Major League Baseball pitcher. Benton played for St. Louis Cardinals in the  season. He played just one game in his career, facing two batters and walking both of them.
He attended the University of Arkansas.

External links

1894 births
1977 deaths
Major League Baseball pitchers
Baseball players from Arkansas
St. Louis Cardinals players
People from Lafayette County, Arkansas